Polish-Soviet border treaty may refer to:
 Border Agreement between Poland and the USSR of 16 August 1945

 1951 Polish–Soviet territorial exchange